Bofedales (singular bofedal), known in some parts of Peru as oconales, are a type of wetland found in the Andes in Peru and Chile. They are a feature in the land use and ecology of high Andean ecosystems. They form in flat areas around ponds or streams and may be permanent or seasonal, and they can be man made or natural. The soil in a bofedal will be moist throughout the year. Bofedales are associated with peat in the soil and the presence of humidity in the soil means that they are green throughout the year. The Ramsar Convention describes bofedales as peatlands without forest. Bofedales absorb the limited amount of water derived from snow, glacier meltwater and rain showers storing it in ground and slowly releasing it. The water can be either fresh or saline. Their vegetation is slow-growing and tough, made up of grasses, especially rushes, and some low spreading herbs. Birds such as the Andean goose, ducks and wading birds use these wetlands for feeding and a wide variety of other birds depend on these permanent water sources and their associated insects. Other types of animals in the bofedales are poorly known.

References

Ecosystems
Marshes